George Williford Boyce Haley (August 28, 1925 – May 13, 2015) was an American attorney, diplomat and policy expert who served under seven presidential administrations. He was one of two younger brothers to the Pulitzer Prize winner Alex Haley.

Early life and education
Haley was born in Henning, Tennessee to Simon Haley and his first wife Bertha. He was the second of their three sons, between Alex and Julius (who grew up to be an architect). His family moved to Pine Bluff, Arkansas and he spent a part of his childhood there. He spent his High school education in Memphis Tennessee at the Booker T. Washington High School.   He attended the Bordentown School in Bordentown, New Jersey. He was a classmate and contemporary of Martin Luther King Jr. at Morehouse College in Atlanta, Georgia.

Haley was the second African-American to receive a law degree from the University of Arkansas.  He worked with attorney and future Supreme Court Justice Thurgood Marshall on the landmark case Brown v. Topeka, Kansas Board of Education case challenging the "separate but equal" in the prior case of Plessy v. Ferguson.

Political career
Haley was elected to the Kansas State Senate in 1964 as a Republican and served one term. Haley served in national administrations beginning in 1969 under Presidents Nixon, Ford, Carter, Reagan, George H. W. Bush, Clinton, and George W. Bush. His government posts included chief counsel of the Federal Transit Administration from 1969 to 1973 and general counsel and congressional liaison of the U.S. Information Agency, now part of the State Department, from 1976 to 1977. He ran unsuccessfully for the United States House of Representatives from Kansas in 1966 and for the United States Senate from Maryland in 1986.  In 1990, President George H. W. Bush appointed Haley chairman of the Postal Rate Commission.  Haley served as Chairman of the Commission from February 14, 1990 until October 14, 1993, and later as a Commissioner from December 1, 1993 until September 10, 1998.

Haley served as United States Ambassador to The Gambia under President Bill Clinton until 2001. Haley died on May 13, 2015, aged 89.

References

1925 births
2015 deaths
African-American diplomats
African-American lawyers
African-American state legislators in Kansas
Ambassadors of the United States to the Gambia
American people of Gambian descent
Bordentown School alumni
Republican Party Kansas state senators
Maryland Republicans
Morehouse College alumni
People from Henning, Tennessee
Politicians from Pine Bluff, Arkansas
University of Arkansas School of Law alumni
20th-century African-American politicians
African-American men in politics
21st-century African-American people
20th-century American diplomats
21st-century American diplomats
20th-century American politicians